The Salgir gudgeon (Gobio krymensis) is a species of gudgeon, a small freshwater fish in the family Cyprinidae. It is widespread in Europe in rivers Salgir, Alma, and Bel Bek drainages (southern Crimea) in Ukraine. It is a freshwater demersal fish, up to 11.0 cm long.

References

 

Gobio
Fish described in 1973
Taxa named by Petre Mihai Bănărescu
Taxa named by Teodor T. Nalbant
Freshwater fish of Europe